Nine Dragons may refer to:
 Nine sons of the dragon, from Chinese mythology, with magical functions in human world
 Nine Dragons (painting), a handscroll by Chinese artist Chen Rong
 Nine-Dragon Wall, screen walls featuring nine dragons, a Chinese imperial motif
 Kowloon, a region in Hong Kong
 Nine Dragon River, the Mekong River in Vietnamese especially the Mekong Delta
 Nine Dragons (novel), a 2009 novel by Michael Connelly
 Nine Dragons Paper Holdings Limited, a paper manufacturing company in Mainland China

See also
 Jiulong (disambiguation)
 Kowloon (disambiguation)
 九龍 (disambiguation)